The Seventh-day Adventist Church is a major Christian denomination with a significant presence in the People's Republic of China with a reported 472,314 members as of June 30, 2020. Many of its pastors in China are women. There are or used to be more than 350 SDA congregations in Jilin Province. Pastor Jan Paulsen, a former Adventist world church president, visited China in 2009. There he said "so many things have changed in China over the last two decades, and while freedom -- the increase of freedom -- is difficult to compare, I am very, very grateful for the fact that so many changes have taken place in this country."

History
In 1888, a Seventh-day Adventist layman named Abraham La Rue began selling publications to people in Shanghai and Hong Kong. He also arranged to have the first Adventist tracts to be published in Chinese.

In 1902, Jacob N. Anderson (1867–1958) and his wife were sent to Hong Kong   where they opened a school for Chinese children. When the Andersons arrived in Hong Kong they found Abram La Rue still selling church publications. They ministered to him in his last illness.

Edwin H. Wilbur arrived in Canton and eight people were baptized in 1903. 
In 1905, Dr. Harry Willis Miller began publishing The Gospel Herald and later established four large hospitals.
By the end of the Second World War, there were twenty-three thousand Seventh-day Adventist members in China with two hundred and sixty one churches.

See also
Australian Union Conference of Seventh-day Adventists
Seventh-day Adventist Church in Brazil 
Seventh-day Adventist Church in Canada 
Seventh-day Adventist Church in Colombia 
Seventh-day Adventist Church in Cuba
Seventh-day Adventist Church in India
Italian Union of Seventh-day Adventist Churches 
Seventh-day Adventist Church in Ghana 
New Zealand Pacific Union Conference of Seventh-day Adventists
Seventh-day Adventist Church in Nigeria 
Adventism in Norway
Romanian Union Conference of Seventh-day Adventists
Seventh-day Adventist Church in Sichuan
Seventh-day Adventist Church in Sweden 
Seventh-day Adventist Church in Thailand
Seventh-day Adventist Church in Tonga
Seventh-day Adventists in Turks and Caicos Islands

References

External links 
UNHCR on Adventism in Singapore and China
 Schaefer, Richard  A. (2005). Legacy: chapter 23, Outreach, section "The China Doctor", i.e. Harry Miller.

Christian denominations in China
History of the Seventh-day Adventist Church
Protestantism in China
China
Seventh-day Adventist Church in Asia